"Thanks for My Child" is a 10/27/1988  debut single by Cheryl Pepsii Riley.  The single was the most successful release for Riley on the Hot Black Singles, and was her only release to make the Hot 100.  "Thanks for My Child" made the Top 40 pop charts peaking at number thirty-two, and reached the number one spot on the Hot Black Singles chart, for one week.

References
 

1988 singles
1988 songs
Song articles with missing songwriters